Uruguay is competing at the 2013 World Aquatics Championships in Barcelona, Spain from 19 July to 4 August 2013.

Swimming

Uruguay has qualified the following four swimmers:

Men

Women

References

External links
Barcelona 2013 Official Site

Nations at the 2013 World Aquatics Championships
World Aquatics Championships
Uruguay at the World Aquatics Championships